Kyle Patrick Juszczyk (born April 23, 1991) is an American football fullback for the San Francisco 49ers of the National Football League (NFL). He played college football at Harvard, and was drafted by the Baltimore Ravens in the fourth round of the 2013 NFL Draft.

Juszczyk is the first Harvard alumnus ever to score a touchdown in a Super Bowl, doing so in Super Bowl LIV.

Early years
Juszczyk was born in Medina, Ohio. He attended Cloverleaf High School in Lodi, Ohio, and played high school football for the Cloverleaf Colts as a tight end.

College career
Juszczyk attended Harvard University, where he played tight end for the Harvard Crimson football team under coach Tim Murphy. He played for the Crimson from 2009–2012. Following his senior season in 2012, he was a unanimous first-team All-Ivy League selection.

In his four years at Harvard, Juszczyk caught 125 passes for 1,576 yards and 22 touchdowns.

Professional career
Coming out of Harvard, many analysts and scouts projected Juszczyk to be a third or fourth round pick. NFLDraftscout.com ranked him the best fullback out of the 94 available. Although he was not invited to the NFL Combine, Juszczyk performed all the required drills and positional workouts at Harvard's Pro Day.

Baltimore Ravens
The Baltimore Ravens chose Juszczyk in the fourth round (130th overall) of the 2013 NFL Draft. He was the first fullback selected of the three chosen in the 2013 NFL Draft. Juszczyk became the first fullback drafted from Harvard and only the tenth player in school history to be drafted. He was the second highest selection in school history, only behind Isaiah Kacyvenski, who was selected in the fourth round (119th overall) in the 2000 NFL Draft.

2013 season

On May 2, 2013, the Baltimore Ravens signed Juszczyk to a four-year, $2.46 million contract that includes a signing bonus of $300,574.

Juszczyk entered training camp his rookie year competing with veteran Vonta Leach to be the Raven's starting fullback. He was named Leach's backup to begin the regular season. He made his professional regular season debut in the Ravens' season-opening 49-27 loss to the Denver Broncos. Throughout his rookie season, he appeared in all 16 regular season games but was used mainly on special teams and as a blocking fullback.

2014 season
The following year, Juszczyk became the Baltimore Ravens' starting fullback with the release of Vonta Leach in February. He also switched his jersey number from #40 to #44, which he had worn at Harvard and Leach had worn the season before. He earned his first career start in the Raven's season-opener loss to the Cincinnati Bengals. On September 21, 2014, he caught three passes for a season-high 54 receiving yards and caught his first career touchdown reception during a 23-21 defeat of the Cleveland Browns. His first career reception was a nine-yard touchdown pass from Joe Flacco. In a Week 10 matchup against the Tennessee Titans, Juszczyk caught a season-high three passes for 26 receiving yards during a 21–7 victory. Juszczyk finished the season with 19 receptions for 182 receiving yards and a touchdown while starting 14 games and appearing in all 16 games. He was named a Pro Bowl alternate at fullback after the 2014 season.

2015 season
Juszczyk returned as the starting fullback in 2015 after winning the job over Kiero Small in training camp. In the season-opener against the Denver Broncos, he had four catches for 17 receiving yards. On October 11, 2015, Juszczyk caught three passes for 31 receiving yards and caught his first touchdown of the season, on an eight-yard pass from Joe Flacco, as the Ravens lost 33–30 to the Cleveland Browns. During a Week 10 loss to the Jacksonville Jaguars, he made a season-high five receptions for 47 receiving yards. The next game, he caught three passes for ten yards and had his first two career carries for three rushing yards during Baltimore's 16-13 victory over the St. Louis Rams. On December 27, 2015, Juszczyk caught five passes for a season-high 55 receiving yards as the Ravens defeated the Pittsburgh Steelers 20–17.

Juszczyk finished the 2015 season with career-highs in receptions (42), receiving yards (321), and receiving touchdowns (4). Juszczyk only had two rushing attempts for three yards in 16 games and 11 starts.

2016 season
Entering the regular season in 2016, Juszczyk was the Baltimore Ravens' starter at fullback and was one of only 17 full-time fullbacks to play in 2016. On September 11, 2016, in the season opener against the Buffalo Bills, he caught two passes for 22 receiving yards and had one carry for two yards as the Ravens won 13-7. On October 2, 2016, Juszczyk caught a career-high six passes for 56 receiving yards as the Baltimore loss to the Oakland Raiders 28-27. On December 25, 2016, Juszczyk scored his first career rushing touchdown against the Pittsburgh Steelers on Christmas Day. He finished the Ravens' 27-31 loss to the Steelers with two carries for 15 rushing yards and his first NFL rushing touchdown while catching two passes for 10 receiving yards. The Ravens were eliminated from playoff contention with the loss. On January 20, 2017, it was announced that was elected as an original selection to his first Pro Bowl. Pro Football Focus ranked Juszcyzk as the top fullback for 2016. He played the most snaps of any fullback in 2016, finishing with 465, which was 115 more than any other fullback.

Free agency
Juszczyk entered free agency for the first time in his career in 2017 and was the top fullback on the market. He received interest and offers from multiple teams, including the Philadelphia Eagles, Cleveland Browns, Buffalo Bills, and the San Francisco 49ers. The Philadelphia Eagles were the top team to possibly land the prized free agent at first, but the Buffalo Bills overtook them as the favorite, as they were looking for a stable replacement for Jerome Felton.

San Francisco 49ers
On March 9, 2017, the San Francisco 49ers signed Juszczyk to a four-year, $21 million contract that includes $7 million guaranteed and a signing bonus of $5 million. It was the largest contract for a fullback in NFL history.

2017 season
In his 49ers debut, Juszczyk had two receptions for 17 yards in the season-opening 23–3 loss to the Carolina Panthers. On December 19, 2017, he was named to his second Pro Bowl.

Juszczyk finished his first season with the 49ers tallying 33 receptions for 315 yards and a touchdown along with 31 rushing yards.

2018 season
In the 2018 season opener against the Minnesota Vikings, Juszczyk recorded a 56-yard reception in the 24–16 loss. During Week 3 against the Kansas City Chiefs, he scored his first touchdown of the season on a 35-yard pass from Jimmy Garoppolo. He was named to his third Pro Bowl for his accomplishments in the 2018 season.

Juszczyk finished the 2018 season with 30 receptions for 324 yards and a touchdown along with 30 rushing yards.

2019 season
In the 2019 season, Juszczyk appeared in 12 games and recorded 20 receptions for 239 receiving yards and one receiving touchdown. He was named to his fourth Pro Bowl.

During Super Bowl LIV against the Kansas City Chiefs, Juszczyk caught three passes for 39 receiving yards and a receiving touchdown in the 31–20 loss. Juszczyk's touchdown reception in the game was the first by a Harvard alumnus in Super Bowl history, and the first by a fullback since Mike Alstott in  Super Bowl XXXVII.

2020 season
In Week 16 against the Arizona Cardinals, Juszczyk recorded two receiving touchdowns in the 20–12 win. He finished the 2020 season with 19 receptions for 202 receiving yards and four receiving touchdowns to go along with 17 carries for 64 rushing yards and two rushing touchdowns. For the fifth consecutive season, he was named to the Pro Bowl. He was ranked 97th by his fellow players on the NFL Top 100 Players of 2021.

2021 season
On March 15, 2021, Juszczyk signed a five-year contract extension with the 49ers worth $27 million. He recorded 30 receptions for 296 receiving yards and one receiving touchdown to go along with a rushing touchdown in the 2021 season. For the sixth consecutive season, he earned a Pro Bowl nomination. He was ranked 100th by his fellow players on the NFL Top 100 Players of 2022.

NFL career statistics

Regular season

Postseason

Personal life
Juszczyk married Kristin Arceri in July 2019.

References

External links

San Francisco 49ers bio
Harvard Crimson bio

1991 births
Living people
American football fullbacks
Harvard Crimson football players
Baltimore Ravens players
San Francisco 49ers players
Sportspeople from Greater Cleveland
Players of American football from Ohio
Harvard Crimson men's basketball players
Harvard Crimson men's track and field athletes
American people of Polish descent
People from Medina, Ohio
American Conference Pro Bowl players
National Conference Pro Bowl players
American men's basketball players